Reda is a unisex given name. Notable people with the name are as follows:

First name

Male

 Reda Aadel (born 1990), Moroccan cyclist
 Reda Abdel Aal (born 1965), Egyptian football player and coach 
 Réda Abdenouz (born 1968), Algerian athlete
 Reda Acimi (born 1969), Algerian football player
 Reda Agourram (born 1990), Moroccan born-Canadian football player
 Reda El Amrani (born 1988), Moroccan tennis player
 Reda El Azab (born 1986), Egyptian football player
 Réda Babouche (born 1979), Algerian football player
 Reda El-Batoty (born 1963), Egyptian weightlifter
 Reda Bellahcene (born 1993), French football player
 Reda Benbaziz (born 1993), Algerian boxer
 Reda Benchehima (born 1978), Algerian fence
 Réda Benzine (born 1971), Algerian athlete
 Reda Boultam (born 1998), Dutch football player
 Reda Benhadj Djillali (born 1978), Algerian football player
 Reda Doumaz (born 1956), Algerian musical artist
 Reda Ereyahi (born 1972), Moroccan football player
 Reda Haikal (born 1990), Egyptian volleyball player
 Reda Hajhouj (born 1994), Moroccan football player
 Reda Hegazy (born 1959), Egyptian politician
 Reda Helal, Egyptian journalist
 Reda Jaadi (born 1995), Belgium-born Moroccan football player
 Réda Johnson (born 1988), French football player
 Reda Kateb (born 1977), French actor
 Reda Khadra (born 2001), German football player
 Reda Kharchouch (born 1995), Dutch football player
 Reda Mansour (born 1965), Israeli historian and diplomat
 Reda Mahmoud Hafez Mohamed (1952–2013), Egyptian Air Force officer
 Reda Rhalimi (born 1982), Moroccan basketball player
 Réda Sayah (born 1989), Algerian football player
 Reda Seyam, German-Egyptian militant
 Reda Shehata (born 1981), Egyptian football player
 Reda Slim (born 1999), Moroccan football player
 Reda Al Tawarghi (born 1979), Libyan football player
 Reda Wardi (born 1995), French rugby union player
 Reda El-Weshi (1985), Egyptian football player
 Reda Yadi (born 1963), Algerian swimmer
 Reda Zeguili, Algerian handball coach

Female
 Reda Aleliūnaitė-Jankovska (born 1973), Lithuanian basketball player
 Reda Gaudiamo (born 1962), Indonesian author and musician
 Reda Ribinskaitė (born 1966), Lithuanian rower

Middle name
 Ahmed Reda Madouni (born 1980), Algerian football player
 Ahmed Reda Tagnaouti (born 1996), Moroccan football player

Stage names
 Reda Caire, stage name of the Egyptian-born French opera singer Joseph Gandhour (1908–1963)

Fictional characters
 Reda Hashem, one of the Homeland characters 

Arabic masculine given names
Unisex given names
Indonesian feminine given names
Lithuanian feminine given names